Bethel Lutheran Church is a historic church located at Main and Fifth Streets in Faith, South Dakota. The church was built in 1925 by a Norwegian Lutheran congregation that formed in Faith in 1917. While Norwegians were one of the largest immigrant groups in western South Dakota, the church is one of the few remaining Norwegian-American sites in Meade County. The church has a vernacular Gothic design typical of Norwegian Lutheran churches. A bell tower with an octagonal spire rises above the front entrance; the tower has Gothic arched openings on all four sides of the bell. The rest of the church is relatively plain and lacking in Gothic details; its significant features include stained glass windows and a Gothic nave plan.

The church was added to the National Register in 1986.

References

Lutheran churches in South Dakota
Churches on the National Register of Historic Places in South Dakota
Gothic Revival church buildings in South Dakota
Churches completed in 1925
Buildings and structures in Meade County, South Dakota
National Register of Historic Places in Meade County, South Dakota